Donald Norton Butchart (born 10 December 1998) is a Zimbabwe-born cricketer. He made his List A debut for Leicestershire against India A in a tri-series warm-up match on 19 June 2018.

References

External links
 

1998 births
Living people
Zimbabwean cricketers
Leicestershire cricketers
Place of birth missing (living people)